Julio Gento López (24 April 1939 – 14 September 2016) was a Spanish professional footballer who played as a forward.

Career
Born in Guarnizo, Gento played for Plus Ultra, Elche, Deportivo La Coruña, CD Málaga, Racing Santander and Palencia.

Personal life
His brothers Paco Gento and Antonio Gento were also footballers. His nephews were also athletes – José Luis Llorente and Toñín Llorente played basketball, whilst Paco Llorente and Julio Llorente were footballers. Grand-nephew Marcos Llorente, son of Paco Llorente, was also a footballer.

References

1939 births
2016 deaths
Spanish footballers
Real Madrid Castilla footballers
Elche CF players
Deportivo de La Coruña players
CD Málaga footballers
Racing de Santander players
Palencia CF players
Segunda División players
La Liga players
Association football forwards
Gento family
People from the Bay of Santander